Michael Moffitt is a former tight end in the National Football League.

Biography
Mike Moffitt was born Michael Jerome Moffitt on July 28, 1963 in Los Angeles, California.

Career
Moffitt played for the Green Bay Packers during the 1986 NFL season. He played at the collegiate level at California State University, Fresno. He currently serves as the Special Assistant to the President for Community Relations at Indiana Wesleyan University in Marion, Indiana.

See also
List of Green Bay Packers players

References

Players of American football from Los Angeles
Green Bay Packers players
American football tight ends
Fresno State Bulldogs football players
Living people
1963 births